The Berlin Wall was constructed in 1961 to separate West Berlin and East Berlin during the Cold War. All the differences between the countries made it a perfect place for people to express their opinions, especially on their preferences and dislikes. Graffiting on the wall became popular for artists from all over the world and a place where tourists would go and admire the artwork. The West Berlin side of the wall had artwork completely covering the wall, while the East Berlin side was kept blank because people were not permitted to get close enough to the eastside of the wall to paint anything.

The Berlin Wall was one of the largest canvases in the world. Much of the artwork was not claimed by artists and remains anonymous. Because the wall was open to everyone, there were no restrictions on what artists could put on the wall. Almost all of the wall has been removed and it only exists in places such as Potsdamer Platz, the East Side Gallery, and Bernauer Straße; many segments are now exhibited in other countries; see List of Berlin Wall segments.

Gallery

References

External links
https://www.berlinwallart.com/
"Berlin Wall Art and Graffiti", dailysoft.com
"West Berlin: The City in the Middle" by Edward Murray

Berlin Wall
Graffiti and unauthorised signage
Cold War in popular culture